The N106 or Chittagong-Rangamati Highway is a Bangladeshi national highway connecting Chittagong with Rangamati via Raozan Upazila & Hathazari Upazila.

Length

66 Kilometre

Chittagong Section

30 Kilometre

Rangamati Section

36 Kilometre

Junction list

The entire route is in Chittagong Division.

Markets crossed

Muradpur, Chittagong City
Oxygen Bus Stand
Chowdhury Hat
Hathazari Municipality
Raozan Municipality
Ranir Hat

See also
N1 (Bangladesh)

References

National Highways in Bangladesh
Transport in Chittagong